Siuslaw is one of the tribes comprising the Confederated Tribes of Siletz Indians and a portion of the off-reservation population forms part of the three Confederated Tribes of Coos, Lower Umpqua and Siuslaw Indians located on the southwest Oregon Pacific coast in the United States. Lower Umpqua (or Kuitsh) and Siuslaw are closely related peoples, both of whom spoke dialects of Siuslaw language (Kuitsh dialect and Siuslaw dialect), a Coast Oregon Penutian language. The Siuslaw language is extinct.

Footnotes

Further reading

 Leo J. Frachtenberg, "Siuslaw," in Franz Boas (ed.), Handbook of American Indian Languages, Part 2. Washington, DC: U.S. Government Printing Office, 1922; pp. 431–630.

External links
Bibliography of the Siuslaw and Kuitsh Indians

www.ctsi.nsn.us - Confederated Tribes of Siletz Indians homepage
Confederated Tribes of Coos, Lower Umpqua, and Siuslaw homepage
Coos, Lower Umpqua & Siuslaw Tribes profile

Native American tribes in Oregon
Confederated Tribes of Siletz Indians